FC Dosta Bystrc-Kníničky is a football club from the district of Bystrc in Brno, Czech Republic. Currently the club plays in the Regional Championship (South Moravia), the fifth tier of Czech competitive football.

The team played in the Czech 2. Liga in the 2006–2007 season.

Historical names

Historical names of Bystrc football team 

Sources: 

 1932 – SK Bystrc (Sportovní klub (Sports club) Bystrc)
 1948 – Sokol Bystrc
 1950 – fusion with Kovomat Brno => TJ Sokol Kovomat Bystrc (Tělovýchovná jednota (Physical education unity) Sokol Kovomat Bystrc)
 1953 – fusion with Dynamo Energetika Brno => DSO Dynamo Energetika Bystrc (Dobrovolná sportovní organisace (Voluntary sports organization) Dynamo Energetika Bystrc)
 1957 – TJ Sokol Bystrc (Tělovýchovná jednota (Physical education unity) Sokol Bystrc)
 1961 – fusion of Bystrc and Kníničky football teams

Historical names of Kníničky football team 

Sources: 

 1932 – DSK Kníničky (Dělnický sportovní klub (Workers sports club) Kníničky)
 1936 – HSK Kníničky (Hasičský sportovní klub (Fire services sports club) Kníničky)
 1947 – SK Kníničky (Sportovní klub (Sports club) Kníničky)
 1961 – fusion of Bystrc and Kníničky football teams

Historical names after fusion 

Sources: 

 1961 – TJ Sokol Bystrc-Kníničky (Tělovýchovná jednota (Physical education unity) Sokol Bystrc-Kníničky)
 1994 – FC Bystrc-Kníničky (Fotbalový klub (Football club) Dosta Bystrc-Kníničky)
 1994 – FC Dosta Bystrc-Kníničky (Fotbalový klub (Football club) Dopravní stavby Bystrc-Kníničky)

Season-by-season record 

Sources:

FC Dosta Bystrc-Kníničky „B“ (reserve team; season-by-season) 

Sources:

References

External links 
  
 FC Dosta Bystrc-Kníničky at jihomoravskyfotbal.cz 

Football clubs in the Czech Republic
Sport in Brno
Association football clubs established in 1932